Michelle Butler-Emmett (born 4 March 1983) is a South African badminton player. She was the All-Africa Games silver medalists in the mixed doubles in 2015 and in the team event in 2011 and 2015. Butler-Emmett won the African Championships in the mixed doubles in 2013 and 2014, also in the women's doubles in 2017.

Achievements

All-Africa Games 
Mixed doubles

African Championships 
Women's singles

Women's doubles

Mixed doubles

BWF International Challenge/Series (8 titles, 4 runners-up) 
Women's doubles

Mixed doubles

  BWF International Challenge tournament
  BWF International Series tournament
  BWF Future Series tournament

References

External links 
 
 

1983 births
Living people
Sportspeople from Durban
South African female badminton players
Badminton players at the 2018 Commonwealth Games
Commonwealth Games competitors for South Africa
Competitors at the 2011 All-Africa Games
Competitors at the 2015 African Games
African Games silver medalists for South Africa
African Games medalists in badminton
20th-century South African women
21st-century South African women